Hiptage benghalensis, often simply called hiptage, is a perennial, evergreen liana native to India, Southeast Asia, Taiwan, and the Philippines. Its habitat is variable and prefers climates ranging from warm temperate to tropical. H. benghalensis is cultivated for its white-pink scented flowers.

Etymology and names

The genus name, Hiptage, is derived from the Greek hiptamai, which means "to fly" and refers its unique three-winged fruit known as "samara". "Benghalensis" is derived from the historic region of Bengal, where it is a native species. Taxonomic synonyms for H. benghalensis include:
Banisteria benghalensis L.
Banisteria tetraptera Sonnerat
Banisteria unicapsularis Lam.
Gaertnera indica J.F.Gmel.
Gaertnera obtusifolia (DC.) Roxb.
Gaertnera racemosa Vahl H. madablota Gaertn.
Hiptage benghalensis (L.) Kunz  forma longifolia Nied.
Hiptage benghalensis (L.) Kurz  forma cochinchinensis Pierre
Hiptage benghalensis (L.) Kurz  forma latifolia Nied.
Hiptage benghalensis (L.) Kurz  forma macroptera (Merr.) Nied.
Hiptage benghalensis (L.) Kurz  forma typica Nied.
Hiptage javanica Blume
Hiptage macroptera Merr.
Hiptage madablota Gaertn.
Hiptage malaiensis Nied.
Hiptage obtusifolia DC.
Hiptage pinnata Elmer
Hiptage teysmannii Arènes
Hiptage trialata Span.
Molina racemosa Cav.
Succowia fimbriata Dennst.
Triopteris jamaicensis L.

H. benghalensis has several vernacular names, including madhavi, vasantduti, chandravalli, madhalata, madhumalati, and madhavilata, "Madhav" being a reference to Lord Krishna. It is known as madhabi lata (মাধবী লতা) or madhoi lata (মাধৈ লতা) in Assamese. In Tamil, it is called Kurukkathi (குருக்கத்தி).

Description

H. benghalensis is a stout, high-climbing liana or large shrub, with white or yellowish hairs on the stem.

H. benghalensis flowers intermittently during the year, and produces fragrant flowers borne in compact ten-to-thirty-flowered axillary racemes. The flowers are pink to white, with yellow marks. Fruits are samaras with three spreading, papery oblanceolate to elliptic wings, 2–5 cm long, and propagate via wind or by cuttings.

Range

Hiptage benghalensis is a native of India, Southeast Asia and the Philippines. It has been recorded as a weed in Australian rain forests and is invasive in Mauritius, Réunion, Florida and Hawaii where it thrives in dry lowland forests, forming impenetrable thickets and smothering native vegetation. The Florida Exotic Pest Plant Council (FLEPPC) listed H. benghalensis among Category II plants in 2001, which are species that have shown a potential to disrupt native plant communities.

Uses

H. benghalensis is widely cultivated in the tropics for its attractive and fragrant flowers; it can be trimmed to form a small tree or shrub or can be trained as a vine. It is also occasionally cultivated for medicinal purposes in the alternative medicine practice ayurveda: the leaves and bark are hot, acrid, bitter, insecticidal, vulnerary and useful in the treatment of biliousness, cough, burning sensation, thirst and inflammation; it also has the ability to treat skin diseases and leprosy.

Notes and references

Footnotes

References
 Bailey, L. H./Bailey, E. Z. 1976. Hortus third: A concise dictionary of plants cultivated in the United States and Canada, Macmillan, New York.
 Agharkar, S.P. 1991. Medicinal plants of Bombay presidency, Scientific Publishes, Jodhpur, India
 Verma, D.M./Balakrishnan, M.P./ Dixit, R.D. 1993. Flora of Madhya Pradesh. Vol. I., Botanical Survey of India, Kolkata, India

External links
 Hiptage benghalensis on Global Invasive Species Database
 Hiptage benghalensis on the Hawaiian Ecosystems at Risk project (HEAR)
 Hiptage benghalensis, Starr report on the Hawaiian Ecosystems at Risk project (HEAR)

Hiptage
Malpighiaceae Malpighiaceae - description, taxonomy, phylogeny, and nomenclature
Hiptage benghalensis-A Database of Medicinal Plants of Assam.

Malpighiaceae
Flora of Taiwan
Flora of tropical Asia
Plants described in 1753
Taxa named by Carl Linnaeus